Edmund Lowson (21 March 1895–1955) was an English footballer who played in the Football League for Blackpool, Bournemouth & Boscombe Athletic, Doncaster Rovers, Durham City and Halifax Town.

References

1895 births
1955 deaths
English footballers
Association football midfielders
English Football League players
Crook Town A.F.C. players
Spennymoor United F.C. players
Nottingham Forest F.C. players
Blackpool F.C. players
Doncaster Rovers F.C. players
AFC Bournemouth players
Poole Town F.C. players
Durham City A.F.C. players
Halifax Town A.F.C. players